Japanese football in 1924.

Emperor's Cup

Births
September 24 - Hidemaro Watanabe

External links

 
Seasons in Japanese football